Monsell may refer to:

Bolton Eyres-Monsell, 1st Viscount Monsell, GBE, PC (1881–1969), British Conservative Party politician, Chief Whip, First Lord of the Admiralty
Elinor Mary Monsell (1871–1954), Irish born illustrator, engraver and portrait painter
Graham Eyres-Monsell, 2nd Viscount Monsell (1905–1994), served in the Intelligence Corps during the World War II, becoming Lieutenant Colonel
Harriet Monsell (1811–1883), founded the Community of St. John Baptist, an order of Augustinian nuns in the Church of England dedicated to social service
J. R. Monsell (1877–1952), Irish illustrator
John Samuel Bewley Monsell (1811–1875), Irish Anglican clergyman and poet
Talbert Monsell Forrest (born 1923), Jamaican politician
William Monsell, 1st Baron Emly PC (1812–1894), Anglo-Irish landowner and Liberal politician

See also
Eyres Monsell, southern suburb of the city of Leicester, England
Viscount Monsell, of Leicester in the County of Leicester, a title in the Peerage of the United Kingdom
Monsell, Ontario in the Muskoka District Municipality in Ontario, Canada
Monascella
Moonspell
Moselle

Surnames
Surnames of British Isles origin
Surnames of Irish origin
Surnames of English origin
English-language surnames